Aethes margaritifera is a species of moth of the family Tortricidae. It is found in Bulgaria, Ukraine, Russia, Kazakhstan and Armenia.

Adults are on wing in March and from May to July.

References

margaritifera
Moths described in 1963
Moths of Asia
Moths of Europe